|}

The Welsh Champion Hurdle is a National Hunt Limited handicap hurdle race in Wales which is open to horses aged four years or older. 
It is run at Ffos Las over a distance of about 2 miles (3,219 metres) and it is scheduled to take place each year in October.

The race was first run in 1969 at Chepstow over 2 miles and continued there until 2002, holding Listed status during the 1980s.
The race was usually run on Easter Monday and prior to the 1990s was usually contested by horses that had performed well in the Champion Hurdle.  
However field sizes were consistently small even in its heyday.

The standard of the race declined in the 1990s, and it was run as a handicap in 1993 and from 2000 until 2002.  
Unfortunately this change did not result in increased fields and the race was dropped from the calendar in 2003.

In 2010 the race was revived, as a Limited Handicap, scheduled to be run at Ffos Las in February, over 2 miles.  However the race was lost to the weather.

The new race did take place in 2011, being won easily by Oscar Whisky, owned by track owner, Dai Walters.

The distance was increased to a distance of 2 miles and 4 furlongs in 2013. The race was moved to a new date in mid-October in 2016 and reverted to 2 miles.

Winners

See also
Horse racing in Great Britain
List of British National Hunt races

References

Racing Post

National Hunt hurdle races
National Hunt races in Great Britain
Chepstow Racecourse
Ffos Las racecourse